In eight-dimensional geometry, a rectified 8-cube is a convex uniform 8-polytope, being a rectification of the regular 8-cube.

There are unique 8 degrees of rectifications, the zeroth being the 8-cube, and the 7th and last being the 8-orthoplex. Vertices of the rectified 8-cube are located at the edge-centers of the 8-cube. Vertices of the birectified 8-cube are located in the square face centers of the 8-cube. Vertices of the trirectified 8-cube are located in the 7-cube cell centers of the 8-cube.

Rectified 8-cube

Alternate names
 rectified octeract

Images

Birectified 8-cube

Alternate names
 Birectified octeract
 Rectified 8-demicube

Images

Trirectified 8-cube

Alternate names
 trirectified octeract

Images

Notes

References
 H.S.M. Coxeter: 
 H.S.M. Coxeter, Regular Polytopes, 3rd Edition, Dover New York, 1973 
 Kaleidoscopes: Selected Writings of H.S.M. Coxeter, edited by F. Arthur Sherk, Peter McMullen, Anthony C. Thompson, Asia Ivic Weiss, Wiley-Interscience Publication, 1995,  
 (Paper 22) H.S.M. Coxeter, Regular and Semi Regular Polytopes I, [Math. Zeit. 46 (1940) 380-407, MR 2,10]
 (Paper 23) H.S.M. Coxeter, Regular and Semi-Regular Polytopes II, [Math. Zeit. 188 (1985) 559-591]
 (Paper 24) H.S.M. Coxeter, Regular and Semi-Regular Polytopes III, [Math. Zeit. 200 (1988) 3-45]
 Norman Johnson Uniform Polytopes, Manuscript (1991)
 N.W. Johnson: The Theory of Uniform Polytopes and Honeycombs, Ph.D. 
  o3o3o3o3o3o3x4o, o3o3o3o3o3x3o4o, o3o3o3o3x3o3o4o

External links 
 Polytopes of Various Dimensions
 Multi-dimensional Glossary

8-polytopes